Maire is a surname. Notable people with the surname include:

 Arnaud Maire (born 1979), French footballer
 Edmond Maire (1931–2017), French labor union leader
 Edouard-Ernest Maire (1848–1932), French missionary and plant collector
 John Maire (1703–1771), English Roman Catholic conveyancer
 Nicolas Rémy Maire (1800-1878), French archetier and bow maker
 René Maire (1878—1949), French botanist and mycologist
 William Maire (1704–1769), English prelate of the Roman Catholic Church

Surnames of French origin